Elliott Wilford Sproul (December 28, 1856 – June 22, 1935) was a U.S. Representative from Illinois.

Biography
Born in Apohaqui, Kings County, New Brunswick, Canada, Sproul attended the public schools. He moved to Boston, Massachusetts in 1879 and to Chicago, Illinois in 1880, and engaged in the building and contracting business. He was naturalized in 1886. He served as member of the Chicago City Council 1896–1899. He served as delegate to the 1920 Republican National Convention. He served as member of the board of directors of the Chicago Public Library 1919–1921.

Sproul was elected as a Republican to the Sixty-seventh and to the four succeeding Congresses (March 4, 1921 – March 3, 1931). He was an unsuccessful candidate for reelection in 1930 to the Seventy-second Congress. He resided in Chicago until his death there on June 22, 1935. He was interred in Mount Hope Cemetery in Chicago, Illinois.

References

1856 births
1935 deaths
People from Kings County, New Brunswick
Canadian emigrants to the United States
Republican Party members of the United States House of Representatives from Illinois
Chicago City Council members
Burials at Mount Hope Cemetery (Chicago)